Kumhrar Assembly constituency is one of 243 constituencies of legislative assembly of Bihar. It comes under Patna Sahib Lok Sabha constituency. In 2015 Bihar Legislative Assembly election, Kumhrar will be one of the 36 seats to have VVPAT enabled electronic voting machines. Kumhrar was initially called Patna Central assembly constituency, but after delimitation it was renamed as Kumhrar assembly constituency.

Overview
Kumhrar comprises Ward Nos. 14 & 16 to 22 in PMC and OG of Patna Rural CD Block.

Member of Legislative Assembly

Election results

Old Segment Election Results

See also
 List of Assembly constituencies of Bihar
 Kumhrar

References

External links
 

Assembly constituencies in Patna district
Government of Patna
Assembly constituencies of Bihar